Brandeis University  is a private research university in Waltham, Massachusetts. Founded in 1948 as a non-sectarian, coeducational institution sponsored by the Jewish community, Brandeis was established on the site of the former Middlesex University. The university is named after Louis Brandeis, the first Jewish Justice of the U.S. Supreme Court.

In 2018, it had a total enrollment of 5,800 students on its suburban campus spanning . The institution offers more than 43 majors and 46 minors and two-thirds of undergraduate classes have 20 students or fewer. It is classified among "R1: Doctoral Universities – Very high research activity" and is a member of Association of American Universities and the Boston Consortium, which allows students to cross-register to attend courses at other institutions including Boston College, Boston University and Tufts University.

The university has a strong liberal arts focus and attracts a geographically and economically diverse student body, with 72% of its non-international undergraduates being from out of state, 50% of full-time undergraduates receiving need-based financial aid and 13.5% being recipients of the federal Pell Grant. 34% of students identify as Jewish. It has the eighth-largest proportion of international students of any university in the United States. Alumni and affiliates of the university include former first lady of the United States Eleanor Roosevelt, Nobel Prize laureate Roderick MacKinnon and Fields Medalist Edward Witten, as well as foreign heads of state, congressmen, governors, diplomats, and recipients of the Nobel Prize, Pulitzer Prize, Academy Award, Emmy Award, and MacArthur Fellowship. Brandeis University is accredited by the New England Commission of Higher Education.

History

Founding

Middlesex University was a medical school located in Waltham, Massachusetts, that was at the time the only medical school in Massachusetts that did not impose a quota on Jews. The founder, John Hall Smith, died in 1944. Smith's will stipulated that the school should go to any group willing to use it to establish a non-sectarian university. Within two years, Middlesex University was on the brink of financial collapse. The school had not been able to secure accreditation by the American Medical Association, which Smith partially attributed to institutional antisemitism in the American Medical Association, and, as a result, Massachusetts had all but shut it down.

Smith's son, C. Ruggles Smith, was desperate for a way to save something of Middlesex University. He learned of a New York committee headed by Israel Goldstein that was seeking a campus to establish a Jewish-sponsored secular university. Smith approached Goldstein with a proposal to give the Middlesex campus and charter to Goldstein's committee, in the hope that his committee might "possess the apparent ability to reestablish the School of Medicine on an approved basis." While Goldstein was concerned about being saddled with a failing medical school, he was excited about the opportunity to secure a  "campus not far from New York, the premier Jewish community in the world, and only  from Boston, one of the important Jewish population centers." Goldstein agreed to accept Smith's offer, proceeding to recruit George Alpert, a Boston lawyer with fundraising experience as national vice president of the United Jewish Appeal.

Alpert had worked his way through Boston University School of Law and co-founded the firm of Alpert and Alpert. Alpert's firm had a long association with the New York, New Haven and Hartford Railroad, of which he was to become president from 1956 to 1961. He is best known today as the father of Richard Alpert (Baba Ram Dass). He was influential in Boston's Jewish community. His Judaism "tended to be social rather than spiritual." He was involved in assisting children displaced from Germany. Alpert was to be chairman of Brandeis from 1946 to 1954, and a trustee from 1946 until his death. By February 5, 1946, Goldstein had recruited Albert Einstein, whose involvement drew national attention to the nascent university. Einstein believed the university would attract the best young people in all fields, satisfying a real need.

In March 1946, Goldstein said the foundation had raised $10 million that it would use to open the school by the following year. The foundation purchased Middlesex University's land and buildings for two million dollars. The charter of this operation was transferred to the foundation along with the campus. The founding organization was announced in August and named The Albert Einstein Foundation for Higher Learning, Inc. The new school would be a Jewish-sponsored secular university open to students and faculty of all races and religions.

The trustees offered to name the university after Einstein in the summer of 1946, but Einstein declined, and on July 16, 1946, the board decided the university would be named after Louis Brandeis. Einstein objected to what he thought was excessively expansive promotion, and to Goldstein's sounding out Abram L. Sachar as a possible president without consulting Einstein. Einstein took great offense at Goldstein's having invited Cardinal Francis Spellman to participate in a fundraising event. Einstein also became alarmed by press announcements that exaggerated the school's success at fundraising.

Einstein threatened to sever ties with the foundation on September 2, 1946. Believing the venture could not succeed without Einstein, Goldstein quickly agreed to resign himself, and Einstein recanted. Einstein's near-departure was publicly denied. Goldstein said that, despite his resignation, he would continue to solicit donations for the foundation. On November 1, 1946, the foundation announced that the new university would be named Brandeis University, after Louis D. Brandeis, justice of the United States Supreme Court. By the end of 1946, the foundation said it had raised over five hundred thousand dollars, and two months later it said it had doubled that amount.

The Brandeis board felt it was in no position to make the investment in the medical school that would enable it to receive accreditation, and closed it in 1947. Einstein wanted Middlesex University's veterinary school's standards to be improved before expanding to the school, while others in the foundation wanted to simply close the veterinary school, which, by the winter of 1947, had an enrollment of just about 100 students. A professional study of the veterinary school recommended dismissing certain instructors and requiring end-of-year examinations for the students, but the foundation declined to enact any of the recommendations, to the dismay of Einstein and a couple of the foundation's trustees.

In early June 1947, Einstein made a final break with the foundation. The veterinary school was closed, despite students' protests and demonstrations. According to George Alpert, a lawyer responsible for much of the organizational effort, Einstein had wanted to offer the presidency of the school to left-wing scholar Harold Laski, someone that Alpert had characterized as "a man utterly alien to American principles of democracy, tarred with the Communist brush." He said, "I can compromise on any subject but one: that one is Americanism." Two of the foundation's trustees, S. Ralph Lazrus and Dr. Otto Nathan, quit the foundation at the same time as Einstein. In response, Alpert said that Lazrus and Nathan had tried to give Brandeis University a "radical, political orientation." Alpert also criticized Lazrus' lack of fundraising success and Nathan's failure to organize an educational advisory committee. Einstein said he, Lazrus, and Nathan "have always been and have always acted in complete harmony."

Opening

On April 26, 1948, Brandeis University announced that Abram L. Sachar, chairman of the National Hillel Commission, had been chosen as Brandeis' first president. Sachar promised that Brandeis University would follow Louis Brandeis' principles of academic integrity and service. He also promised that students and faculty would never be chosen based on quotas of "genetic or ethnic or economic distribution" because choices based on quotas "are based on the assumption that there are standard population strains, on the belief that the ideal American must look and act like an eighteenth-century Puritan, that the melting pot of America must mold all who all who live here into such a pattern." Students who applied to the school were not asked their race, religion, or ancestry.

Brandeis decided its undergraduate instruction would not be organized with traditional departments or divisions, and instead it would have four schools, namely the School of General Studies, the School of Social Studies, the School of Humanities, and the School of Science. On October 14, 1948, Brandeis University received its first freshman class of 107 students. They were taught by thirteen instructors in eight buildings on a  campus. Students came from 28 states and six foreign countries. The library was formerly a barn, students slept in the former medical school building and two army barracks, and the cafeteria was where the medical school had stored cadavers. Historians Elinor and Robert Slater later called the opening of Brandeis one of the great moments in Jewish history.

Early years
Eleanor Roosevelt joined the board of trustees in 1949. Joseph M. Proskauer joined the board in 1950. Construction of on-campus dormitories began in March 1950 with the goal of ninety percent of students living on campus. Construction on an athletic field began in May 1950. Brandeis' football team played its first game on September 30, 1950, a road win against Maine Maritime Academy. Its first varsity game was on September 29, 1951, with a home loss against the University of New Hampshire. Brandeis Stadium opened in time for a home win against American International College on October 13, 1951. The team won four of nine games during its first season. Construction of a 2,000-seat amphitheater began in February 1952.

The state legislature of Massachusetts authorized Brandeis to award master's degrees, doctorate degrees, and honorary degrees in 1951. Brandeis' first graduating class of 101 students received degrees on June 16, 1952. Leonard Bernstein, director of Brandeis' Center of Creative Arts, planned a four-day ceremony to commemorate the occasion. Held in the newly opened amphitheater, the ceremony included the world premier of Bernstein's opera Trouble in Tahiti. Eleanor Roosevelt and Massachusetts Governor Paul A. Dever spoke at the commencement ceremony.

In 1953, Einstein declined the offer of an honorary degree from Brandeis, writing to Brandeis president Abram L. Sachar that "what happened in the stage of preparation of Brandeis University was not at all caused by a misunderstanding and cannot be made good any more." Instead, at the graduation ceremony for Brandeis' second graduating class of 108 students, individuals given Brandeis' first honorary degrees included Illinois Senator Paul H. Douglas, Rabbi Louis Ginzberg, and Alpert. 1953 also saw the creation of the Department of Near Eastern and Judaic Studies, one of the first academic programs in Jewish Studies at an American university. Among the founders were distinguished emigre scholars Alexander Altmann, Nathan Glatzer and Simon Rawidowicz. Brandeis inaugurated its graduate program, the Graduate School of Arts and Sciences, in 1954. In the same year, Brandeis became fully accredited, joining the New England Association of Colleges and Secondary Schools. As of 1954, Brandeis had 22 buildings and a  campus.

In 1954, Brandeis began construction on an interfaith center consisting of separate Roman Catholic, Protestant, and Jewish chapels. Designed by the architectural firm of Harrison & Abramovitz, the three chapels surrounded a natural pond. Brandeis announced that no official chaplains would be named, and attendance at chapel services would not be required. The Roman Catholic chapel was named Bethlehem, meaning house of bread, and it was dedicated on September 9, 1955. Dedicated on September 11, 1955, the Jewish chapel was named in memory of Mendel and Leah Berlin, parents of Boston surgeon Dr. David D. Berlin. Named in memory of Supreme Court Justice John Marshall Harlan, the Protestant chapel was dedicated on October 30, 1955. 

In 1956 Brandeis received a one-million-dollar donation from New York industrialist Jack A. Goldfarb to build a library. The building, named the Bertha and Jacob Goldfarb Library in his honor, was designed by Harrison & Abramovitz, a firm which designed many campus buildings in the 1950s. Built of brick and glass, the library was designed to hold 750,000 volumes.

A nine-foot bronze statue of Justice Louis D. Brandeis is a campus landmark. The sculpture, created by sculptor Robert Berks, was unveiled in 1956 in honor of the 100th anniversary of Brandeis' birth. Berks' wife Dorothy had been the Justice's personal assistant for 39 years and wore his actual robes to model the statue.

After Brandeis University awarded an honorary doctorate to Israeli Premier David Ben-Gurion in 1960, Jordan boycotted Brandeis University, announcing that it would not issue currency permits to Jordanian students at Brandeis.

Beginning in fall 1959, singer Eddie Fisher established two scholarships at the university, one for classical and one for popular music, in the name of Eddie Cantor.

On May 16, 1960, Brandeis announced it would discontinue its varsity football team. President Abram Sachar pointed to the cost of the team as one reason for the decision. Brandeis' football coach Benny Friedman said it was difficult to recruit football players who were also excellent students with so much competition in the Boston metropolitan area. Brandeis said the discontinuation of varsity football would allow it to expand intercollegiate activity in other sports. During its nine years of varsity play, Brandeis' football team recorded 34 wins, 33 losses, and four ties. In 1985, Brandeis was elected to membership in the Association of American Universities, an association that focuses on graduate education and research.

1960s: Countercultural epicenter 
Brandeis became an epicenter of radical student activism and anti–Vietnam War protests during the counterculture of the 1960s. It was the National Student Strike Information Center during the student strike of 1970.

Student takeover of Ford Hall 
On January 8, 1969, about 70 black students entered then-student-center, Ford Hall, ejected everyone else from the building, and refused to leave. The students' demands included the hiring of more black faculty members, increasing black student enrollment from four percent to ten percent of the student body, establishing an independent department on African American studies, and an increase in scholarships for black students. Over 200 white students staged a sit-in in the lobby of the administration building. President Morris B. Abram said that, although he recognized "the deep frustration and anger which black students here and all over the country—and often is—the indifference and duplicity of white men in relation to blacks", the students' actions were an affront to the university. The faculty condemned the students' actions as well. On the fourth day of the protest, the Middlesex Superior Court issued a temporary restraining order, requiring the students to leave Ford Hall. While Abram would not allow the order to be enforced by forcibly removing the students from Ford Hall, 65 students had been suspended for their actions. On January 18, the black students exited Ford Hall, ending the eleven-day occupation of the building. There had been no violence or destruction of property during the occupation, and Brandeis gave the students amnesty from their actions. Ronald Walters became the first chair of Afro-American studies at Brandeis later the same year. Ford Hall was demolished in August 2000 to make way for the Shapiro Campus Center, which was opened and dedicated October 3, 2002.

Late 20th century: Institutional crisis 
In the 1970s, Brandeis faced a financial crisis as donations from American Jews decreased as they turned toward support for Israel and other causes.

Samuel O. Thier, president from 1991 to 1994, helped to restabilize the university.

21st century 

In 2014, Brandeis announced it would offer an honorary doctorate to Ayaan Hirsi Ali, "a staunch supporter of women's rights", and an outspoken campaigner against female genital mutilation, honor killing and Islamic extremism in general. After complaints from the Council on American-Islamic Relations and internal consultation with faculty and students, Brandeis publicly withdrew the offer, citing that Ali's statements condemning Islam were "inconsistent with the University's core values". 87 out of 511 faculty members at Brandeis signed a letter to the university president.

The university announced that the decision to withdraw the invitation was made after a discussion between Ayaan Ali and President Frederick Lawrence, stating that "She is a compelling public figure and advocate for women's rights ... but we cannot overlook certain of her past statements". According to Brandeis, Ali was never invited to speak at commencement, she was only invited to receive an honorary degree. Ali said that Brandeis' decision surprised her because Brandeis said they did not know what she had said in the past even though her speeches were publicly available on the internet, calling it a "feeble excuse". Ali stated that the university's decision was motivated in part by fear of offending Muslims. She argued that the "spirit of free expression" referred to in the Brandeis statement has been betrayed and stifled.

While some commentators such as Abdullah Antepli, the Muslim chaplain and adjunct faculty of Islamic Studies at Duke University, applauded the decision and warned against "making renegades into heroes", other academic commentators such as the University of Chicago's Jerry Coyne and the George Mason University Foundation Professor David Bernstein criticized the decision as an attack on academic values such as freedom of inquiry and intellectual independence from religious pressure groups.

Presidents 
The presidents of Brandeis University are as follows.

Campus

The Heller School
The Heller School for Social Policy and Management is notable for its programs in social policy, health policy and management, and international development. Researchers at the graduate school and research institution research policy in health; mental health; substance abuse; children, youth, and families; aging; international and community development; developmental disabilities; philanthropy; and work and inequalities. U.S. News & World Report ranked the Heller School in the top 10 schools of social policy in its 2013 rankings.

International Business School 

Brandeis International Business School is a professional school dedicated to teaching and research in business, finance, economics and data analytics. The International Business School is an AACSB-accredited institution with programs ranked among the best in the world.

The International Business School offers five graduate programs, two accelerated graduate programs, six dual-degree programs and undergraduate majors and minors in business and economics. The school was established in 1994 as the Graduate School of International Economics and Finance, offering a PhD in International Economics and Finance and Master of Arts in International Economics and Finance (MA). In 1998, the school launched the Master of Business Administration (MBA) and Master of Science in finance (MSF) programs. In 2003, the school changed its name to Brandeis International Business School. In 2018, the school launched the Master of Science in business analytics (MSBA) program.

The Rabb School of Continuing Studies 

With more than 4,000 enrollments a year, the Rabb School of Continuing Studies develops educational offerings across four distinct divisions. It provides professional development opportunities through degree programs, personal enrichment and lifelong learning.

Graduate School of Arts and Sciences 
One of four graduate schools on campus, the Graduate School of Arts and Sciences (GSAS) offers over 40 programs, 18 of which are doctoral programs. Brandeis graduate students are eligible to cross-register for courses at Boston College, Boston University, Tufts University, and the Graduate Consortium in Women's Studies at MIT. Brandeis is also a member of the Boston Library Consortium, composed of 18 academic and research institutions in Massachusetts, Connecticut, Rhode Island, and New Hampshire.

Rose Art Museum 

Established in 1961, the Rose Art Museum is a museum dedicated to 20th- and 21st-century art.

Library 
The Brandeis Library provides resources and services to support research, scholarship, teaching, and learning on campus.

The library manages more than 1,500,000 physical volumes, and more than 600,000 electronic books, as well as electronic journals and online databases. As part of the library, the Robert D. Farber University Archives & Special Collections Department houses Brandeis University's unique and rare primary sources, which support teaching, research and scholarship at the university and beyond. The department comprises University Archives, containing materials related to Brandeis University, and Special Collections, including rare books, original manuscripts dating from the 13th to 21st centuries, unique primary source material, and a wide variety of visual material.

Subject strengths include the Holocaust and Jewish resistance to persecution; Jewish-American and émigré writers, composers and performing artists; left- and right-wing movements in the United States and Europe; and American and European political leaders and social reformers. Major collections include material on the Spanish Civil War, novelist Joseph Heller, caricaturist Honoré Daumier, and Justice Louis Dembitz Brandeis.

Academics

Rankings

 Brandeis was ranked No. 1 among the top 380 colleges in the United States for student engagement in community service, according to The Princeton Review in 2015.
U.S. News & World Report ranked Brandeis tied for No. 44 in its 2022 annual list of Best National Universities. Acceptance to Brandeis was characterized as "most selective". 
 It was ranked No. 9 of Most Liberal Students in 2009, and No. 10 in 2014.
No. 34 among Best Values in Private Universities according to Kiplinger's Personal Finance in its 2016 ranking of best value private universities in the United States.
No. 2 among national universities for doctoral program in Neuroscience and Neurobiology (tied with Johns Hopkins University and Yale University), according to the National Research Council (United States) in 2010.
No. 99 among 650 undergraduate institutions and 51st among national research universities in the 2017 ranking from Forbes.
 One of the Top 20 Small Research Universities based on the Faculty Scholarly Productivity Index (2006–07)
 Named the 6th happiest university by Unigo in 2012
Brandeis International Business School was ranked No. 1 by Financial Times from 2010 through 2013 for its Master of Arts in International Economics and Finance Program.

Organization and administration
The schools of the university include:

 The Brandeis University College of Arts and Sciences
 The Graduate School of Arts and Sciences
 The Heller School for Social Policy and Management
 Rabb School of Summer and Continuing Studies
 Brandeis International Business School

The College of Arts and Sciences comprises 24 departments and 22 interdepartmental programs, which, in total, offer 43 majors and 47 minors.

The Heller School for Social Policy and Management, founded in 1959, is noteworthy for its graduate programs in healthcare administration, social policy, social work, and international development. Internships, research assistantships and other hands-on experiences are available throughout the curriculum. The global and experiential dimensions of education at Brandeis are carried out through international centers and institutes, which sponsor lectures and colloquia and add to the ranks of distinguished scholars on campus.

The Brandeis University Press, a member of the University Press of New England, publishes books in a variety of scholarly and general interest fields. The Goldfarb Library at Brandeis has more than 1.6 million volumes and 300,000 e-journals. The library also houses a large United States Government archive. Brandeis University is a part of the Boston Library Consortium, which allows its students, faculty, and staff to access and borrow books and other materials from other BLC institutions including Tufts University and Williams College.

Cohen Center for Modern Jewish Studies
In 1980, Brandeis University established the Maurice and Marilyn Cohen Center for Modern Jewish Studies, the first academic center devoted to the study of Jewish life in the United States. The Cohen Center's work spans basic research on Jewish identity to applied educational evaluation studies. The center's recent signature studies include research with participants in Taglit-Birthright Israel, investigations of synagogue transformation, analyses of Jewish summer camping, and socio-demographic studies of Jewish communities throughout the United States. CMJS research has altered the understanding of contemporary Jewish life and the role of Jewish institutions in the United States.

Schuster Institute for Investigative Journalism
The Schuster Institute for Investigative Journalism was launched in September 2004 as the first investigative reporting center based at a United States university. It was named for founding benefactors Elaine Schuster and Gerald Schuster.

The institute's major projects were:
the Political & Social Justice Project
the Justice Brandeis Innocence Project
the Gender & Justice Project.

The Schuster Institute closed at the end of 2018 due to financial considerations.

Steinhardt Social Research Institute

The Steinhardt Social Research Institute was created in 2005 from a gift from Michael Steinhardt as a forum to collect, analyze, and disseminate data about the Jewish community and about religion and ethnicity in the United States. The first mission of SSRI was to interpret the inherent problems with the National Jewish Population Survey of 2000 (NJPS). SSRI has done a Jewish Population Survey of the Greater Boston area,
the results of which were released on November 9, 2006.

The Institute collects and organizes existing socio-demographic data from private, communal, and government sources and will conduct local and national studies of the character of American Jewry and Jewish organizations. The work of the institute is done by a multidisciplinary staff of faculty and scholars, working with undergraduate and graduate students, and augmented by visiting scholars and consultants. The institute works in close collaboration with the Maurice and Marilyn Cohen Center for Modern Jewish Studies.

Women's Studies Research Center

The Women's Studies Research Center (WSRC) is directed by Professor of Sociology and Women's, Gender and Sexuality Studies Karen V. Hansen. The WSRC was founded in 2001 by Professor Emerita of Sociology Shulamit Reinharz. It is home to three general programs:

 The Scholars Program, which consists of about 70 academic scholars from around the world who study gender through an interdisciplinary lens
 The Student-Scholar Partnership Program, which pairs Brandeis University undergraduate students with WSRC scholars for semester-long, paid research assistantships
 The Arts Program, which oversees the Kniznick Gallery, devoted to feminist artwork

The center is located at the Epstein Building on the Brandeis campus.

Notable faculty and graduates

Among the better-known graduates are co-creators of the television show Friends David Crane and Marta Kauffman, political activists Abbie Hoffman and Angela Davis, journalists Thomas Friedman and Paul Solman, Congressman Stephen J. Solarz, physicist and Fields medalist Edward Witten, mathematician and Abel Prize recipient Karen Uhlenbeck, novelist Ha Jin, political theorist Michael Walzer, actresses Debra Messing and Loretta Devine, philosopher Michael Sandel, Olympic Silver Medalist fencer Tim Morehouse, social and psychoanalytic theorist Nancy Chodorow, author Mitch Albom, filmmakers Debra Granik and Jonathan Newman, music producer Jon Landau, and computer scientist Leslie Lamport.

Among the distinguished faculty, present and past, are mathematician Heisuke Hironaka, a Fields medalist, biologists and Nobel laureates Michael Rosbash and Jeffrey C. Hall, composers Arthur Berger, Leonard Bernstein, Martin Boykan, Eric Chasalow, Irving Fine, Donald Martino, David Rakowski, Harold Shapero, and Yehudi Wyner, social theorist Herbert Marcuse, psychologist Abraham Maslow, linguist James Pustejovsky, human rights activist Eleanor Roosevelt, Anita Hill, historian David Hackett Fischer, economist Thomas Sowell, chemist S Katharine Hammond, diplomat Dennis Ross, children's author Margret Rey, former United States Secretary of Labor Robert Reich, sociologist Morrie Schwartz, poets Olga Broumas and Adrienne Rich, author Stephen McCauley, virologist and author of Fields Virology Bernard N. Fields and Pulitzer Prize–winning columnist Eileen McNamara.

Publications

Newspaper and yearbook
 Archon, the yearbook
 The Barrister News Ltd was a politically neutral broadside weekly newspaper with nationally syndicated features, published 1985–1991.
 The Blowfish, a satirical newspaper founded in February 2006, is published every other Thursday. The first issue appeared inside The Hoot, and every issue since then has been published independently.
The Justice, which was founded in 1949 (one year after the university's inception) is an administratively independent weekly newspaper distributed every Tuesday during term.
The Brandeis Hoot, founded in 2005, is an independent weekly newspaper published on Fridays.

Magazines
 The Louis Lunatic, founded in the winter of 2004, is a student-run sports magazine released each semester, discussing Brandeis and national sports.
 Gravity, a humor magazine founded in 1990
 Laurel Moon, a literary magazine launched in 1991
 Artemis, a feminist magazine published intermittently in the 1980s-1990s and revived during the fall 2013 semester.
 Under the Robe, an arts and entertainment social tabloid published by The Barrister 1985–1988
 Where the Children Play, a literature and arts magazine founded in 1994 by Phil Robinson and Abigail Myers

Journals
 Brandeis Economic & Finance Review, founded by Jordan Caruso in 2010, is a student-run online and print publication dedicated to issues in business, economics, and finance. Nobel Laureate Dr. Robert Solow contributed an original article for the Fall 2010 printed publication.
 Brandeis International Journal, a student-run semesterly publication on international affairs, which became the Brandeis Journal of Politics. 
 Brandeis University Law Journal, founded in 2008, is the only undergraduate-edited legal publication not affiliated with a law school in the United States.
 The Brandeis Scope reports on research occurring on the Brandeis University campus and affiliated laboratories in the sciences.
 Louis Magazine, a defunct journal of intellectual discourse, 1999–2002
 The Pulse, reports on advances in medicine; published by the Pre-Health Society

Athletics

Brandeis fields 19 Division III varsity athletic programs. Brandeis athletic teams compete in the University Athletic Association (UAA).

Brandeis has won NCAA team championships in men's soccer (1976) and men's cross country (1983), as well as 24 individual titles. Brandeis teams have earned 17 NCAA Division III Tournament berths and won eight Eastern Collegiate Athletic Association (ECAC) New England crowns in the last decade. Nine teams have earned national rankings, with men's and women's basketball and men's and women's soccer all ascending to the top 10 in the nation during that span. In 2017, the men's team reached the Sweet 16 of the NCAA Tournament for the sixth year in a row, and reached the Final Four for the second straight year. It was the fourth straight year they finished ranked a top ten team in the country. Also earning national rankings in '13-14 were women's cross country and men's and women's tennis.

Brandeis also sponsors 20 club sports. Among them, ultimate frisbee, crew, archery and women's rugby have had success on a national level. The program's many intramural sports are open to students, faculty and staff.

Research
Brandeis is classified among "R1: Doctoral Universities – Very High Research Activity". In FY 2017, Brandeis spent $68.4 million on research and was ranked 174 in the nation by total R&D expenditure. These include sponsored research funds from sources including the National Institutes of Health; the National Science Foundation and the US Department of Health and Human Services as well as a range of foundations.

The university's Division of Science encompasses seven departments (Biochemistry, Biology, Chemistry, Computer Science, Mathematics, Physics, and Psychology), five interdepartmental programs (Biochemistry & Biophysics, Biological Physics, Biotechnology, Genetic Counseling, Molecular & Cell Biology, and Neuroscience), six science centers (Ashton Graybiel Spatial Orientation Laboratory, National Center for Behavioral Genomics, Rosenstiel Basic Medical Sciences Research Center, Sloan-Swartz Center for Theoretical Neurobiology, Benjamin and Mae Volen National Center for Complex Systems, and W.M. Keck Institute for Cellular Visualization), and more than 50 laboratories that investigate fundamental life processes ranging from the structure and function of individual macromolecules to the mechanisms that control the behavior of whole organisms.

Faculty, postdoctoral fellows, graduate students and undergraduates investigate areas such as neuronal development and plasticity, signal transduction, immunology, the molecular basis of genetic recombination, and the three-dimensional structure of macromolecular assemblies. Brandeis science faculty include 12 National Academy of Science members, three Howard Hughes Medical Institute Investigators, two Howard Hughes Medical Institute professors, two MacArthur Foundation Fellows, and 15 American Association for the Advancement of Sciences Fellows.

Brandeis undergraduate students have the opportunity to work with faculty, postdoctoral students and graduate students to conduct
original laboratory research. Brandeis also offers a number of funding resources to support independent undergraduate research projects. In 2008, Brandeis established a Science Posse program, a merit-based scholarship program that admits students based on their academic, leadership and communication skills, and their interests in studying science. Founded by Irving Epstein, the Henry F. Fischbach Professor of Chemistry, and supported by a Howard Hughes Medical Institute grant, the Science Posse program is focused on increasing the recruitment and retention of students from traditionally underrepresented groups in the sciences. The program recruits, trains, and provides mentoring and other services for 10 inner-city Atlanta students each year who are interested in studying science at the undergraduate level.

In 2014, the National Science Foundation renewed funding for Brandeis' Materials Research Science and Engineering Center (MRSEC), which was established in 2008. This center supports interdisciplinary and multidisciplinary materials research and education that address fundamental problems in science and engineering that are important to society. In particular, the center uses simplified components to create new materials that have some of the functionalities found in living organisms.

Student life 

The university has an active student government, the Brandeis Student Union, as well as more than 270 student organizations. Fraternities and sororities aren't officially recognized by Brandeis University, as they are contrary to a central tenet of the university, namely, that student organizations be open to all students, with membership determined by competency or interest. According to an official handbook, "exclusive or secret societies are inconsistent with the principles of openness to which the University is committed.".

Brandeis has 11 a cappella groups, six undergraduate-run theater companies, one sketch comedy troupe (Boris' Kitchen, founded in 1987), four improv-comedy groups, and many other cultural and arts clubs, as well as student activism groups that advocate for causes including environmentalism, immigration reform, LGBTQ rights, feminism, and anti-racism. Brandeis is also home to what has been cited as one of the country's few undergraduate-run law publications. Of particular note is the Brandeis Academic Debate and Speech Society (B.A.D.A.S.S.), which consistently ranks as one of the top 10 debate teams in the United States, and participates across the globe in the World Universities Debating Championships each year. During the 2012–2013 school year, B.A.D.A.S.S. was the second most successful team overall on the American Parliamentary Debate Association Circuit.

Cholmondeley's coffeehouse, commonly referred to as "Chums", is located in Brandeis' Usen Castle. Chums is a popular site for student performances and concerts, including Tracy Chapman, Bob Dylan, Joan Baez, Matt Pond PA, and Genesis (notable as their first American performance). Early footage of Chums appears in the short documentary film, Coffee House Rendezvous. Cholmondley's is named after a notoriously ill-tempered Basset hound that was the on-campus pet for Ralph Norman, the campus photographer during the first years of Brandeis. The dog roamed the campus after dark, growling at students, often nipping at their cuffs and making a general nuisance of himself. After his death, the coffee house was named for him, not so much in remembrance but in celebration. In 2015, in an email to student workers of the coffee house, Brandeis administration announced the immediate closure of Chums Coffeehouse, leaving said student workers unemployed. After significant pushback from the student body and alumni alike, the administration determined to make the closure temporary while the space underwent renovations.

Brandeis University's Campus Sustainability Initiative seeks to reduce the university's environmental and climate change impact. The university's accomplishments in the arena of sustainability include the creation of a student-organized on-campus Farmers' Market, the implementation of a single-stream recycling program, and the transition to GreenE certified wind power for 15% of the school's electricity needs. Brandeis also offers an environmental studies academic program, which includes courses such as Greening the Ivory Tower: Improving Sustainability of Brandeis and Community, which serves as an incubator for student led sustainability projects. Student projects have included greening campus offices, running after-school environmental education programs for children in the Waltham schools, and cleaning up local streams and ponds. In addition, a student-led project in 2014 established a rooftop farm atop the Gerstenzang science building consisting of 1,500 potted milk crates.

Students also have the option of taking courses with a "Community Engaged Learning" (CEL) aspect. Community-engaged learning is an aspect of the university's broad-based commitment to experiential learning.

Emergency medical services are provided by the Brandeis Emergency Medical Corps, nicknamed BEMCO, a Massachusetts-certified EMT-Basic volunteer student organization which does not charge a fee for any of its emergency services.

Security escort services are provided around the campus and into Waltham by the student-run "Branvan," which runs on a daily schedule from 4:00 pm to 2:30 am on weekdays and from 12:00 pm to 2:30 am on weekends.

Wien International Scholarship
The Wien International Scholarship Program was instituted by Brandeis University for international undergraduate students. It was established in 1958 by Lawrence A. and Mae Wien. The family had three objectives: to further international understanding, to provide foreign students an opportunity to study in the United States, and to enrich the intellectual and cultural life at Brandeis. The Wien Scholarship offers full or partial tuition awards; these awards are need-based and require the applicants to present outstanding academic and personal achievement. Each year, the recipients of the scholarship take a week-long tour of a destination in the United States. In previous years, the students have visited the United Nations in New York City, and did relief work in New Orleans following Hurricane Katrina. In April 2008, the university hosted a three-day-long celebration for the 50th anniversary of the program.

See also

List of Brandeis University people
 List of Jewish universities and colleges in the United States
National Center for Jewish Film
Rosenstiel Award
 Our Generation Speaks

Notes

References

Further reading
 Pasternack, Susan, and Ralph Norman. From the Beginning: A Picture History of the First Four Decades of Brandeis University (1988)
 Sachar, Abram L. Brandeis University: A Host at Last (1995), Scholarly history of the school
 Whitfield, Stephen J., and Jonathan B. Krasner. "Jewish Liberalism and Racial Grievance in the Sixties: The Ordeal of Brandeis University," Modern Judaism, (Feb. 2015) 35#1 pp: 18–41.

External links 

Official athletics website
 Website of The Justice campus newspaper

 
Private universities and colleges in Massachusetts
Educational institutions established in 1948
Jewish education in Massachusetts
Jewish universities and colleges in the United States
Jews and Judaism in Massachusetts
Buildings and structures in Waltham, Massachusetts
Universities and colleges in Middlesex County, Massachusetts
1948 establishments in Massachusetts